The Feds is a series of Australian television films starring Robert Taylor, which were first broadcast on the Nine Network 1993–1996.

The Feds revolves around the activities of the Australian Federal Police, who protect the national interests from crime in Australia and overseas. Nine telemovies were produced in the series.

Regular cast
 Robert Taylor as Superintendent Dave Griffin 
 Angie Milliken as Detective Sergeant Jo Moody 
 John Bach as Commander Rainer Bass
 Brian Vriends as Michael Skinner 
 Nell Feeney-Connor as Rose Dell'oro 
 Marcus Eyre as Blocker 
 Amanda Jane Bowden as Tina McLean 
 Zoe Bertram as Sarah Griffin 
 Benjamin Keatch as Brett Griffin

The Feds (pilot)

A barrister and a brain surgeon suspected of fraud are tracked down by the Feds.

The film was shot 1 March - 2 April 1993 on location in Melbourne, Canberra and Hong Kong.

Cast actors: 
 Sigrid Thornton as Christine McQuillan 
 Bruno Lawrence as Larry Porter 
 Nicki Wendt as Melita Reale 
 Rachel Griffiths as Angela Braglia

The Feds: Terror

Guest actors:

 Max Tidof as Jurgen Dietermann
 Colin Moody as Hans Holder 
 Erica Peril as Karen Siddeley
 Paul Caesar as Eric King
 Bruce Barry as Stanley Hickock
 Nicholas Hammond as Milton

The Feds: Obsession

Guest actors:

 Jerome Ehlers as Cal Woods
 Denis Moore as Justice Fairweather
 John Jacobs as Phil O'Leary
 Stephen Whittaker as Glen Warrender

The Feds: Abduction

Guest actors: 
 John McTernan as Alan Guinnane 
 Anne Tenney as Suzi Plummer 
 Lani John Tupu as Idris Karya
 Jackie Kelleher as Sarminah

The Feds: Seduction

Guest actors:

 Peta Toppano as Brandy 
 Petru Gheorghiu as Mendosa 
 Jonathan Elsom as Justin 
 Peter McCauley as Chad
 Carlos Sanchez as Lopez
 Richard Moss as Senator North
 Alberto Vila as Julio Blanco

The Feds: Suspect

Guest actors:

 Susie Edmonds as Chief Inspector Beckwith
 Paul Sonkkila as Commander Rock 
 John Higginson as Superintendent Pappas 
 Kevin Summers as Sen Sgt Del Re 
 Mark Neal as Det Const Barnes 
 Shannon McNamara as Niki Webster 
 Andrew Blackman as Ponytail

The Feds: Deception

Guest actors:

 Rachael Beck as Judy Taylor 
 Nadine Garner as Tammy Warren 
 Daniel Lapaine as Tony Waterman 
 Nicholas Bell as Stephen Garrard 
 Stephen Whittaker as Glen C Warrender 
 Teo Gilbert as Jak Waterman

The Feds: Vengeance

Guest actors:

 John Stanton as John Dyer
 Lisa Hensley as Annie Fleming
 Steven Vidler as Ed Bishop
 Frances O'Connor as Arianna
 Fiona Spence as Lisa

The Feds: Deadfall

Guest actors:

 Martin Jacobs as Gerry Lehman 
 Simon Bossell as Gil McPherson 
 Max Tidof as Hauptkommissar Jurgen Dietermann
 Belinda McClory as Pauline

The Feds: Betrayal

Guest actors:

 Peter Phelps as Brian Petrie 
 Tammy MacIntosh as Nicky Bass 
 Chris Haywood as Daniel "Mac" McIntyre
 Max Tidof as Hauptkommissar Jurgen Dietermann
 Peter Hosking as Assist. Commissioner Roland Cloke

References

External links
 Australian Television Information Archive
The Feds at the National Film and Sound Archive

Nine Network original programming
Australian drama television series
1993 Australian television series debuts
1996 Australian television series endings